Santa Fe Trail Historical Park, also called Pioneer Park, is located on the bank of the Rio Hondo River in El Monte, California. The location was designated a California Historic Landmark (No. 975) on Aug. 13, 1987. This was originally an encampment on the Old Spanish Trail. The Old Spanish Trail was an extension of the trail from Missouri to Santa Fe, New Mexico. The Gila River trail also ended in El Monte. By the 1850s, those in El Monte started to call the town the `End of the Santa Fe Trail." This claim is disputed by some, such as the Santa Fe in New Mexico.  In the 1800s permanent settlements were established by immigrants from Texas and Arkansas, the first settlement in Southern California founded by citizens of the United States.  
The state marker for the Santa Fe Trail Historical Park is located at 3564 Santa Anita Ave, El Monte, CA 91731. The City of El Monte held a ceremony to dedicate the Santa Fe Trail Historical Park on June 2, 1989.

El Monte built the (now closed) Santa Fe Trail Historical Park in 1989, near Valley Blvd and Santa Anita Ave. The one-acre park has two historic structures and a covered wagon. The park is on the west side of Santa Anita Avenue, just a few blocks north of the Interstate 10 in California freeway and south of the El Monte City Hall. Soon after it opened, the park closed, and the city has no plans to reopen it. The El Monte Historical Museum at 3150 Tyler Avenue show cases the Santa Fe Trail and El Monte's Historical importance to Southern California.

Marker
The state marker reads:
El Monte, on the bank of the San Gabriel River, played a significant part in California's early pioneer history. It was first an encampment on the Old Spanish Trail, and extension of the trail from Missouri to Santa Fe. By the 1850s some began to call El Monte the "End of the Santa Fe Trail." Early in that decade a permanent settlement was established  here by immigrants from Texas. The first settlement in Southern California founded by citizens of the United States.

See also
California Historical Landmarks in Los Angeles County
Savannah Memorial Park
List of California Ranchos

Mission San Gabriel Arcángel

References

1822 establishments in Alta California
El Monte, California
California Historical Landmarks